Lieutenant-General Naseem Rana (Urdu: نسيم رانا; born 20 September 1942) was a retired three-star general in the Pakistan Army, who served as the director-general of the Inter-Services Intelligence (ISI) from 1995 to October 1998. Rana belongs to Rajpoot Family of Faisalabad region of the Punjab Province.[2]

Military career
Rana was born in middle-class family of Lyallpur (Now Faisalabad) Punjab, British Indian Empire in 1942, in the midst of World War II. After receiving his initial education, Rana went on to join the Pakistan Military Academy in 1960. Rana' gained his B.Sc. and specialized in military communications. After his graduation, Rana was given commissioned in the Corps of Signals Engineering on 19 April 1964. Rana participated in Indo-Pakistani war of 1965 and led a Signals platoon. After the war, Rana was sent to complete a military staff course in Quetta. In 1967, Rana joined the Command and Staff College in Quetta and where he gained M.Sc. in Military science in 1969. Following his degree, Rana was promoted to Lieutenant-Colonel and commanded a Signal battalion.

Stationed close to the Indo-Pakistani border, Rana' commanded the Signals battalion during the Indo-Pakistani war of 1971. After the war, Rana' served in Lahore and later joined the National Defence University in 1974. In 1976, Rana obtained M.Sc. in Operational analysis and was promoted to the rank of Colonel. Following his degree, Rana was made Colonel on the Staff of the 40th Army Infantry Division and served there until 1980. In 1981, Rana went to United States and attended the United States Army Command and General Staff College.

Staff appointments
Rana is a prominent attendee of the international Defence Management course in the United States where he gained specialized degree in operational and command analysis in 1984. After his education, Rana began in active duty and was stationed near the Pakistan-Afghanistan border where a major battle against the Soviet Union and her ally Communist Afghanistan was underway.

As part of the successful covert operations, Rana remained a vital part in the war and coordinated joint operations in the war. During the 1980s, Rana was made instructor at the School of Infantry and Tactics followed by academic professor at the Command and Staff College Quetta.

In the late 1980s, Rana was promoted to 1-star Brigadier General and was made director-general of the Combat Development Directorate, and later he was made directorate-general of the Weapon and Equipment Directorate. In 1991, Rana was promoted to two star Major-General and was made General Officer Commanding of an Infantry Division based in Punjab.

In 1995, he was promoted to three star Lieutenant General and was appointed as the Director General of the Inter-Services Intelligence (ISI) as critical developments were taking place in Afghanistan.

War in Afghanistan

In 1996, a civil war was spread in all over Afghanistan involving the Afghan Taliban and the Northern Alliance. During the course of the civil war, Rana commanded the ISI in support of the Taliban, playing a pivotal role in providing help to irregular hardline forces supporting the Taliban against the United Front (Northern Alliance). In 1997, independent brigades of 40th Infantry and the Frontier Force Regiment moved to protect the Pakistani border from any infiltrations

From 1995 until 2001, Rana was the central planner for Pakistan's war in Afghanistan where he was responsible for coordinating military, intelligence, and strategic operations against the Northern Alliance. His role in the Pakistan war in Afghanistan was vital as he served as the commander of entire Pakistan Army's combatant elements in the Afghanistan. In 2007, Dr. Ayesha Siddiqa, a Pakistani research scholar, wrote and published a book, titled "Military Inc" providing the accounts of his military involvements in Afghanistan. Dr. Ayesha  Siddiqa termed him as Georgy Zhukov of Pakistan, due to his resemblance to Georgy Zhukov.

Defence Secretary

Shortly after General Musharraf installed a military government, Rana was appointed as the Defence Secretary of Pakistan, a post he headed as Lieutenant-General until 2001. In the aftermath of terrorist attacks on the United States on September 11, 2001, General Musharraf immediately removed him from the post as he was one of the primary figures involved with the Taliban in Afghanistan.

References

1942 births
Defence Secretaries of Pakistan
Directors General of Inter-Services Intelligence
Pakistani generals
Living people